Vita & Virginia is a 2018 biographical romantic drama film directed by Chanya Button. The screenplay, written by Button and Eileen Atkins, is adapted from the 1992 play Vita & Virginia by Atkins. The film stars Gemma Arterton, Elizabeth Debicki, and Isabella Rossellini. Set in the 1920s, Vita & Virginia tells the story of the love affair between Vita Sackville-West and Virginia Woolf.

The film had its world premiere as a Special Presentation at the Toronto International Film Festival on 11 September 2018. It was released in the United Kingdom on 5 July 2019, and in the United States on 23 August 2019.

Plot 

Set in the 1920s, the writers Vita Sackville-West and Virginia Woolf move in different London circles. When they meet, Vita decides Virginia will be her next conquest. They have an affair against the background of each of their open marriages.

Cast

Production 
On 30 June 2016, Deadline Hollywood reported that British director Chanya Button was to direct Vita and Virginia from a script by Eileen Atkins, with Evangelo Kioussis of Mirror Productions and Katie Holly of Bl!nder Films as producers. The screenplay is based on Atkins' stage play Vita & Virginia. Gemma Arterton, who also became an executive producer of the film, had received the first draft from Atkins years before and showed it to Button; and Button subsequently co-wrote the final script with Atkins.

On 8 February 2017, it was announced that Eva Green and Gemma Arterton had been cast in the film. In May 2017, it was reported that Green had left the project due to scheduling conflicts. Green was replaced by Andrea Riseborough. Elizabeth Debicki was eventually cast in the role of Woolf in August 2017, with Isabella Rossellini also joining the production.

Financing was procured from the Irish Film Board, Piccadilly Pictures, Sampsonic Media, and Lipsync Productions; with Protagonist Pictures handling international sales. Principal photography began in September 2017 in Dublin, Ireland.

In August 2017, Thunderbird Releasing acquired the distribution rights for the United Kingdom. Distribution rights for Germany were acquired by NFP, Australia and New Zealand by Transmission Films, Czech Republic and Slovakia by CinemArt, Greece by Seven Films, Hong Kong by EDKO, Israel by Forum Film, Poland by M2 Films, Portugal by Lusumundo, and in the former Yugoslavia by MCF.

The first film still was released by Protagonist Pictures on 1 November 2017.

Release
The world premiere was held at the Toronto International Film Festival on 11 September 2018. It was selected as the opening night film of the 2019 Frameline Film Festival in San Francisco and the 2019 BFI Flare in London.

Vita and Virginia was released theatrically in the United Kingdom and Ireland on 5 July 2019 by Thunderbird Releasing. It was released in the United States on 23 August 2019 by IFC Films.

Home media
The film was released on video on demand (VOD) in the US on 30 August 2019.

Reception

Critical reception 
The website's critics consensus reads: "Vita & Virginia takes a well-acted and initially intriguing look at the relationship between its real-life protagonists, but is undone by unsatisfying storytelling." According to Metacritic, which sampled the opinions of 18 critics and calculated a score of 43 out of 100, the film received "mixed or average reviews".

Accolades 
Elizabeth Debicki's portrayal of Virginia Woolf was recognised with a nomination for Best Supporting Actress at the 22nd British Independent Film Awards. The film was also nominated for Best Makeup & Hair at the 16th Irish Film & Television Awards.

Notes

References

Further reading

External links 
 
 Vita and Virginia at British Council Film
 

2018 films
2018 LGBT-related films
2018 biographical drama films
2010s historical drama films
2010s historical romance films
2018 romantic drama films
Biographical films about poets
British biographical drama films
British films based on plays
British historical drama films
British historical romance films
British LGBT-related films
British romantic drama films
Irish biographical drama films
Irish films based on plays
Irish historical films
Irish LGBT-related films
Irish romantic drama films
Lesbian-related films
Biographical films about LGBT people
LGBT-related romantic drama films
Romantic drama films based on actual events
Cultural depictions of Virginia Woolf
2010s English-language films
2010s British films